The 1885 Bruce by-election was a by-election held on 5 August 1885 in the  electorate during the 9th New Zealand Parliament.

The by-election was held after the resignation of Robert Gillies for health reasons. He had won the seat at the general .

He was replaced by Donald Reid.

A former representative of the Bruce electorate, William Murray, was invited to contest the by-election but he declined.

J. C. Anderson was born in Bruce and had farmed there for thirteen years.

William Hutchison wrote that he had "many pleasant memories" of the electorate

but another correspondent said it was a "very palpable defeat" and denied that the Kaitangata miners were told how to vote.

Results
The following table gives the election result:

References

Bruce 1885
1885 elections in New Zealand
Politics of Otago